Charles M. Williams was the first head football and men's basketball coach for the Temple University Owls located in Philadelphia, Pennsylvania, and he held that position for five seasons, from 1894 until 1898. His overall coaching record for Temple football was 13 wins, 15 losses, and 1 tie. This ranks him ninth at Temple in terms of total wins and tenth at Temple in terms of winning percentage. For basketball, he posted a 73–32 record.

Head coaching record

Football

References

External links
 Charles M. Williams at the College Football Data Warehouse

Year of birth missing
Year of death missing
Temple Owls football coaches
Temple Owls men's basketball coaches